Diosdado Mendizábal Mifumu (born 21 October 1997), known as Ricky Mendizábal, is a Spanish-born Equatoguinean basketball player who plays as a power forward for Liga EBA club CB Virgen de la Concha and the Equatorial Guinea national team.

Early life
Mendizábal was born in Zumarraga and is of Equatorial Guinean descent.

Club career
Mendizábal is a Saski Baskonia product. After four youth seasons there, he moved to Ointxe! Arrasateko SKE, where he made his Liga EBA debut.

International career
Mendizábal has played for the Equatorial Guinea national basketball team in January 2020 at the AfroBasket 2021 qualification (pre-qualifiers group C).

References

External links

1997 births
Living people
Citizens of Equatorial Guinea through descent
Equatoguinean men's basketball players
Power forwards (basketball)
Centers (basketball)
Spanish men's basketball players
Sportspeople from Gipuzkoa
Spanish sportspeople of Equatoguinean descent
Club Ourense Baloncesto players
Araberri BC players
People from Goierri
Basketball players from the Basque Country (autonomous community)